Marlet is a surname. Notable people with the surname include:

 Christiane Marlet (born 1954), French athlete
 Jean-Henri Marlet (1771–1847), French painter 
 Nico Marlet, French-American animator 
 Steve Marlet (born 1974), French footballer

See also
 Marlett, typeface
 Marlette (disambiguation)